Structure theorem may refer to:
 Structured program theorem, a result in programming language theory
 Structure theorem for finitely generated modules over a principal ideal domain, a result in abstract algebra (a subject area in mathematics)
 Structure Theorem of Bass-Serre theory, a result in Geometric group theory. (another subject area in mathematics)